Ganges was launched in 1799 at Newcastle-upon-Tyne. She made one voyage for the British East India Company (EIC) bringing rice from Bengal for the British government. She then became a West Indiaman until the French navy captured her in 1805.

Career
Ganges appeared in the Register of Shipping (RS) for 1800 with F.Brown, master, Hurry & Co., owners, and trade Newcastle–London.

EIC voyage (1800–02): Messrs. Prinsep and Saunders tendered Ganges to the EIC to bring back rice from Bengal for the British Government. She was one of 28 vessels that sailed on that mission between December 1800 and February 1801.

On 30 December 1800 Captain Forster Brown sailed Ganges from the Downs bound for Bengal. She arrived at Calcutta on 25 May 1801. She left Bengal on 13 September and reached St Helena on 1 January 1802. She arrived at the Downs on 1 March.

The RS for 1802 showed Ganges still with F.Brown, master, and Hurry & Co., owners, but with trade London–Bengal.

On her return Ganges became a West Indiaman. Lloyd's Register (LR) for 1803 showed her with W.O.Carr, master, Hurry & Co., owners, and trade London–Dominica.

Fate
Lloyd's List (LL) for 7 January 1806 reported that Ganges, Rand, master, was one of several vessels that the "Rochfort Squadron" had captured and sent into Teneriffe prior to November 1805. RS for 1806 carries the annotation "Captured" by Gangess name.

Fortuitously, a flotilla from Rochefort captured a whaler named  around 15 December 1805, or early in 1806.

Notes, citations, and references
Notes

Citations

References

 

1799 ships
Age of Sail merchant ships of England
Ships of the British East India Company
Captured ships